Matthew, Count of Boulogne, also known as Matthew of Alsace (–1173) was the second son of Thierry, Count of Flanders and Sibylla of Anjou. Matthew forcibly abducted the nun  Marie de Boulogne, daughter of Stephen, King of England, and constrained her into marriage, claiming the title of Count of Boulogne  in 1160. The forced marriage was opposed by the Church and finally annulled in 1170, but he continued to rule as count until his death.

Matthew and Marie had two daughters: Ida, Countess of Boulogne, and Maud of Boulogne. Maud married Henry I, Duke of Brabant. In 1171, Matthew married Eleanor, daughter of Ralph I, Count of Vermandois, they had one short-lived daughter.

Matthew was a supporter of Henry the Young King, and received lands in England. He died fighting at the siege of Driencourt, during the 1173–74 revolt of Henry II of England's sons, under the leadership of Philip of Flanders. Wounded by a crossbow bolt, he did not recover.

References

Sources

1173 deaths
Counts of Boulogne
Year of birth uncertain
Jure uxoris officeholders
House of Metz
Deaths by arrow wounds
French military personnel killed in action